Thomas Gillespie is an ecologist and epidemiologist recognized for his integrative approach to the conservation of biodiversity and mitigation of emerging infectious diseases. He is currently a professor at Emory University.

Gillespie was among the first to demonstrate that human impact on the environment can alter the dynamics of natural pathogens in wildlife, and create opportunities for pathogens to jump between species. His efforts serve as demonstration projects of the One Health Approach.  He has, also, guided international efforts to protect endangered species from human diseases and prevent future pandemics.

References

External links
 Gillespie Research Group at Emory University
 Google Scholar Profile
 Professional Twitter Profile

University of Florida alumni
Emory University faculty
Primatologists
Living people
University of Illinois Urbana-Champaign alumni
American ecologists
American epidemiologists
Year of birth missing (living people)
Conservation biologists